Paul Gilligan may refer to:

Paul Gilligan (judge) (born 1948), Irish judge
Paul Gilligan (cartoonist), Canadian creator of Pooch Café